Wareham St Martin is a civil parish in the English county of Dorset. The parish spreads across a large, and mostly rural area to the north of the town of Wareham including much of Wareham Forest. However the town of Wareham lies within its own civil parish, and the only significant settlement within Wareham St. Martin parish is the village of Sandford on the A351 road between Wareham and Poole.  The parish also includes the Holton Heath trading estate.

The parish has an area of 29.66 square kilometres. At the time of the 2001 census, it had a population of 2,752 living in 1,146 dwellings. The parish was part of the Purbeck local government district of the county of Dorset. It is within the Mid Dorset and North Poole constituency of the House of Commons. Prior to Brexit in 2020, it was in the South West England constituency of the European Parliament.

References

External links 

Wareham St Martin Parish Council
Census data for Wareham St Martin parish

Civil parishes in Dorset